The postal history of the Bahamas begins in the 18th century, with the first post office operating since 1733. The earliest known letters date from 1802. In 1804 a straight-line "BAHAMAS" handstamp came into use. The Royal Mail Line initiated a regular mail service in 1841, and from 1846 used a "Crown Paid" handstamp along with a dated postmark for New Providence.

First stamps 
The use of postage stamps began in April 1858 with a consignment of British stamps. These were cancelled "A05" at Nassau. The use of British stamps was brief however; in the following year the Bahamian post office became independent of London, and issued its own stamps beginning 10 June 1859. These stamps featured the "Chalon" portrait of Queen Victoria, along with symbols of the islands (pineapple and conch shell) and the inscription "INTERINSULAR POSTAGE", because at first the stamps were used only locally, with London continuing in charge of external mail until May 1860.

Printed by Perkins Bacon, initially unwatermarked and imperforate, perforation was introduced in 1860, and the "Crown & CC" watermark in 1863. The transition to local control left Bahamians with only their 1d stamp to pay all rates of postage, and covers to foreign destinations show blocks of the stamp used to cover the 4d rate to North America and the 6d rate to Great Britain. The government remedied this in 1861 by contracting for 4d and 6d stamps, still using the Chalon head, but with a simpler design. De la Rue later took over printing duties in 1862, their product being differentiated by an 11.5-12 perforation, as opposed to the previous 14-16. A one-shilling value appeared in 1865.

In 1884, a new design employed the ubiquitous Victoria profile of the time, with the symbols retained, and "BAHAMAS" inscribed with colored letters in an arch over the vignette. Values issued ranged up to one pound. In 1901, the Bahamas became one of the Empire's early issuers of a pictorial stamp, with a depiction of the Queen's Staircase in Nassau. The same design was reused for 5-pence, 2-shilling, and 3-shilling values in 1903. In 1915, the Bahamas concluded an unusual agreement with Canada, in which the two countries arranged special delivery services by exchanging stamps, this being done for the benefit of tourists visiting from Canada. The Bahamians accomplished by overprinting 5d Staircase issues with "SPECIAL / DELIVERY" and sending them to Canada, where they were on sale in four post offices (Ottawa, Toronto, Westmount, and Winnipeg) for 10 cents each. The arrangement was short-lived, with only about 430 overprinted stamps being sold in Canada while it was in effect.

Twentieth century 
The years from 1902 into the 1930s involved the usual profiles of Edward VII and George V. In 1920 a set of five stamps celebrated peace after World War I, and in 1930 another set of five depicting the Bahamian seal marked the 300th anniversary of the colony's founding.

In 1935, a pictorial stamp depicted flamingoes in flight; this design was re-used in 1939 replaced with George VI's profile, along with designs showing Fort Charlotte, and a "sea garden", likely the first time underwater scenery appeared on a stamp. But the mainstay of the George VI period was a set of small definitives only slightly updated from previous designs.

In October 1942, the definitives were overprinted to mark the 450th anniversary of Christopher Columbus' landing. In 1948, the 300th anniversary of the settlement of Eleuthera was commemorated with a set of 16 pictorials (somewhat belated in a way, since most of the Empire's colonies had extensive pictorial sets issued for them in 1938). The designs were re-used  in the issue of 1954, replacing the portrait with one of Elizabeth II, and removing the commemorative inscription.

The Bahamas issued commemoratives for the centenary of Bahamian stamps in 1959, and for the centenary of Nassau in 1962. Also in 1962, two stamps were overprinted to mark the talks that led to the Nassau agreement. In 1964 the entire set of the 1954 issue was overprinted "NEW CONSTITUTION / 1964" in recognition of self-government.

A new set of 15 definitives in 1965 featured an updated layout, but repeating many of the same themes as seen in the 1954 stamps. These were overprinted with new currencies in the decimalisation of 1966, and then redesigned in 1967 with the new values.

From the 1970s on, the Bahamas issued an assortment of large and colorful stamps aimed at collectors, though not in great numbers.

See also 
 List of people on stamps of the Bahamas
 Revenue stamps of the Bahamas

Sources 
 Stanley Gibbons Ltd: various catalogues.
 Stamps of the World http://stampsoftheworld.co.uk/wiki/Category:Bahamas
 AskPhil – Glossary of Stamp Collecting Terms
 Encyclopaedia of Postal History

Further reading
 
 Ludington, M.H. Bahamas early mail services and postal markings. s.l.: M.H. Ludington, 1982 210p.
 
 Proud, Edward B. The Postal History of Bahamas. Heathfield: Proud-Bailey, 2000  392p.

Philately of the Bahamas